Deerfield is an unincorporated community in Chickasaw County, Iowa, United States. It is located near the intersections of County Highways B28 and T76 on the east side of the Wapsipinicon River. It is five miles east of Colwell and four miles northwest of North Washington, at 43.162975N, -92.495651W.

History
 Deerfield was named after Deerfield, Massachusetts; the area was first settled by whites in 1854. Deerfield's population was estimated as 150 in 1875, and was 29 in 1902.

References

Unincorporated communities in Chickasaw County, Iowa
Unincorporated communities in Iowa